Timeless Season  is a Chinese drama series which co-produce by Double Vision and ntv7. It was aired every Monday to Thursday, at 10:00pm on Malaysia's ntv7.

Cast
Eunice Ng
Kirby Chan
Steve Yap

Chinese-language drama television series in Malaysia
2009 Malaysian television series debuts
2010 Malaysian television series endings
NTV7 original programming